Gombe,  is a small town in Wakiso District in the Central Region of Uganda.

Location
The coordinates of the town are 0°29'19.0"N 32°28'50.0"E (Latitude:0.488599; Longitude:32.480550).

Landmarks
The landmarks within the town limits or close to the edges of the town include:

 administrative headquarters of Gombe sub-county, an administrative unit within Butambala District Administration
 headquarters of Gombe Town Council
 Gombe central market

See also
Gombe, Butambala
List of cities and towns in Uganda

References

Wakiso District
Populated places in Central Region, Uganda
Cities in the Great Rift Valley